Walter Francis Sweeney (April 18, 1941 – February 2, 2013) was an American professional football player who was an offensive lineman in the American Football League (AFL) and National Football League (NFL). He played college football at Syracuse University, where he made the school's all-century team.  He also played in the North-South Game and the College All-Star Game.  A first-round draft pick of the San Diego Chargers in 1963, Sweeney helped them win the AFL championship.

Career
A premier guard, Sweeney was versatile enough to fill virtually any offensive line position. He was named to All-Star teams and Pro Bowls for nine consecutive years at offensive guard, beginning with the 1964 AFL All-Star Team, and in 1970 was selected to the All-Time All-AFL second-team. Sweeney spent 11 seasons as an offensive guard with the Chargers, then played two seasons with the Washington Redskins.  The Professional  Football Researchers Association named Sweeney to the PRFA Hall of Very Good Class of 2009 

Sweeney, who stood 6'4" and weighed 256 pounds, was such an intimidating presence on the field that Merlin Olsen famously remarked he'd "rather sell used cars" than play against Sweeney each game. Sweeney was among several Chargers fined by the league in 1974 for drug use. A fierce critic of the NFL, he blamed the league for his prolonged problems with drugs and alcohol. Towards the end of his life he retained this bitterness. "If a guy breaks his back in the N.F.L., they'll pay him. That didn't happen to me. Instead, these guys broke my mind." He briefly served as a drug counselor at a San Diego hospital and appeared with Nancy Reagan in a promo for her "Just Say No" campaign.

Death
Sweeney died of pancreatic cancer on February 2, 2013, at his home in San Diego, California.

See also
 List of American Football League players

References

 

1941 births
2013 deaths
American Football League All-Star players
American Football League All-Time Team
American Conference Pro Bowl players
San Diego Chargers players
Syracuse Orange football players
Washington Redskins players
People from Cohasset, Massachusetts
Players of American football from Massachusetts
Deaths from cancer in California
Deaths from pancreatic cancer
American Football League players